The Majeerteen Sultanate, also known as Majeerteenia and Migiurtinia, was a Somali kingdom centered in the Horn of Africa. Ruled by Boqor Osman Mahamuud during its golden age, the sultanate controlled the areas which are now called Puntland. The earliest mention of the kingdom is the 16th century. The polity had all of the organs of an integrated modern state and maintained a robust trading network. It also entered into treaties with foreign powers and exerted strong centralized authority on the domestic front.

History

Establishment
The Majeerteen Sultanate was established possible around 1600s by Somalis from the Majeerteen Darod clan. It reached prominence during the 19th century, under the reign of the resourceful Boqor (King) Osman Mahamuud.

Majeerteen-British agreement

Due to consistent ship crashes along the northeastern Cape Guardafui headland, Boqor Osman's kingdom entered into an informal agreement with Britain, wherein the British agreed to pay the King annual subsidies to protect shipwrecked British crews and guard wrecks against plunder. The agreement, however, remained unratified, as the British feared that doing so would "give other powers a precedent for making agreements with the Somalis, who seemed ready to enter into relations with all comers."

Sultanate of Hobyo

Osman Mahamuud's Kingdom was under attack in the mid-19th century due to a power struggle between himself and his ambitious cousin, Yusuf Ali Kenadid. After almost five years of battle, the young upstart was terribly defeated and finally forced into exile in Yemen. A decade later, in the 1870s, Kenadid returned from the Arabian Peninsula with a band of Hadhrami musketeers and a group of devoted lieutenants. With their assistance along with aid and weaponry from Boqor Osman, he managed to overpower the local Hawiye clans and establish the separate Sultanate of Hobyo (Obbia) in 1878.

Majeerteen-Italian treaties
In the late 19th century, all extant Somali monarchs entered into treaties with one of the colonial powers, Abyssinia, Britain or Italy, except for the Dhulbahante, since the Italians considered part of the Dhulbahante subject of the Italian-protected Sultan of the Majeerteen. With the intermediation of Sultan Yusuf Ali Kenadid & after a conference of all notablels of the sultanate in Bargal, In 7. April 1889 in Alula, Somalia, Boqor Osman entered into a treaty with Italy, making his kingdom a protectorate known as Italian Somaliland. In the years following the treaty the protectorate was however rather nominal due to Italian warships tasked with maintaining contact with the sultan visiting so rarely & irregularly. Piracy, looting of crashed steamships, weapons trade & slave trade could be carried out with almost no consequences.

His second cousin and rival Sultan Yusuf Ali Kenadid had signed a similar agreement vis-a-vis his own Sultanate of Hobyo the year before. Both Boqor Osman and Sultan Kenadid had entered into the protectorate treaties to advance their own expansionist goals, with Sultan Kenadid looking to use Italy's support in his ongoing power struggle with Boqor Osman over the Majeerteen Sultanate, as well as in a separate conflict with the Omani Sultan of Zanzibar over an area to the north of Warsheikh. In signing the agreements, the rulers also hoped to exploit the rival objectives of the European imperial powers so as to more effectively assure the continued independence of their territories.

The terms of each treaty specified that Italy was to steer clear of any interference in the sultanates' respective administrations. In return for Italian arms and an annual subsidy, the Sultans conceded to a minimum of oversight and economic concessions. The Italians also agreed to dispatch a few ambassadors to promote both the sultanates' and their own interests. The new protectorates were thereafter managed by Vincenzo Filonardi through a chartered company. An Anglo-Italian border protocol was later signed on 5 May 1894, followed by an agreement in 1906 between Cavalier Pestalozza and General Swaine acknowledging that Baran fell under the Majeerteen Sultanate's administration. With the gradual extension into northern Somalia of Italian colonial rule, both Kingdoms were eventually annexed in the early 20th century. However, unlike the southern territories, the northern sultanates were not subject to direct rule due to the earlier treaties they had signed with the Italians.

Administration

Bureaucracy

The Sultanate of Hobyo, the Majeerteen Sultanate exerted a strong centralized authority during its existence, and possessed all of the organs and trappings of an integrated modern state: a functioning bureaucracy, a hereditary nobility, titled aristocrats, a state flag, as well as a professional army. Both sultanates also maintained written records of their activities, which still exist.

The Majeerteen Sultanate's main capital was at Alula, with its seasonal headquarters at Bargal. It likewise had a number of castles and forts in various areas within its realm, including a fortress at Murcanyo.

The Majeerteen Sultanate's ruler, however, commanded more power than was typical of other Somali leaders during the period. As the primus inter pares, Boqor Osman taxed the harvest of aromatic trees and pearl fishing along the seaboard. He retained prior rights on goods obtained from ship wrecks on the coast. The Sultanate also exerted authority over the control of woodland and pastureland, and imposed both land and stock taxes.

Commerce

According to official reports from 1924 commissioned by the Regio Governo della Somalia Italiana, the Majeerteen Sultanate maintained robust commercial activities before the Italian occupation of the following year. The Sultanate reportedly exported 1,056,400 Indian Rupees (IR) worth of commodities, 60% of which came from the sale of frankincense and other gums. Fish and other sea products sold for a total value of 250,000 IR, roughly equivalent to 20% of the Sultanate's aggregate exports. The remaining export proceeds came from livestock, with the export list of 1924 consisting of 16 items.

Military
In addition to a strong civil administration, the Majeerteen Sultanate maintained a regular army. Besides protecting the polity from both external and internal threats, military officials were tasked with carrying out the King's instructions. The latter included tax collection, which typically came in the form of the obligatory Muslim alms (seko or sako) ordinarily tithed by Somalis to the poor and religious clerics (wadaads).

Puntland
Established in 1998, the autonomous Puntland region in northeastern Somalia now administers much of the former territories of the Majeerteen Sultanate (Migiurtinia).

Sultans
Rulers of the Majeerteen Sultanate:

See also
Adal Sultanate
Ajuran Sultanate
Isaaq Sultanate
Ali Yusuf Kenadid
List of Muslim empires and dynasties
List of Sunni Muslim dynasties

Notes

References

The Majeerteen Sultanates

External links

The Majeerteen Sultanates
lntroduction and change to the somalo in Migiurtinia and other comissariats
Square kilometers of Migiurtinia according to Encyclopadeia Britannica (1983)
In 1938, Mussolini briefly considered settling Jews into Migiurtinia and turning it into a Jewish state
World famous incense was from Migiurtinia
First whispers of democracy and anti democracy protests took place in Migiurtinia and Mudugh
Sultanate of Migiurtinia signed a treaty with the Italy Government on April 7, 1889.

 
17th-century establishments in Africa
1924 disestablishments in Africa
States and territories established in the 17th century
States and territories disestablished in 1924
20th-century disestablishments in Somalia
Former sultanates